Albrights Corner is an unincorporated community in the Canadian province of New Brunswick.

History

Albrights Corner was originally called Little River but popularly became named after Thomas Sidney Albright (d. 1914), who owned and operated a farm and general store there for many years. His widow Lillian (Jordan) continued to operate the farm until the late 1950s.

Notable people

See also
List of communities in New Brunswick

References

Communities in Sunbury County, New Brunswick